Colin J. Dixon (3 December 1943 – 21 June 1993) was a Welsh rugby league footballer who played in the 1960s, 1970s and 1980s, and coached in the 1970s. He played club level rugby union (RU) for Cardiff International Athletic Club, and representative level rugby league (RL) for Great Britain and Wales, and at club level for Halifax (captain), Salford and Hull Kingston Rovers.

Background
Dixon was born in Butetown, Cardiff, Wales, and he died aged 49 in Halifax, West Yorkshire.

Rugby career

Halifax
Dixon, like Gus Risman and Billy Boston, was a product of South Church Street School in Cardiff's Butetown. Playing in the Cardiff RFC Youth team, he was already showing something of his future potential but was overlooked by Wales (RU) Youth. As a seventeen-year-old he signed for Halifax in 1961. Dixon played  in Halifax's 10-0 victory over Featherstone Rovers in the 1963–64 Yorkshire Cup Final during the 1963–64 season at Belle Vue, Wakefield on Saturday 2 November 1963. In 1964 he was a key player in the first Halifax side to win the championship since 1907.

Dixon played in Halifax's 15–7 victory over St. Helens in the 1964–65 Championship Final during the 1964–65 season at Station Road, Swinton on Saturday 22 May 1965.

As Halifax's captain in the 1967 and 1968 seasons Dixon led the side by example and was rewarded with his first Great Britain cap in 1968.

Salford
Transferred a few weeks later to Salford for a record £15,000 (based on increases in average earnings, this would be approximately £431,500 in 2016), he played in the Challenge Cup Final of 1969 losing to Castleford. Had Salford won he would almost certainly have been awarded the Lance Todd Trophy. That same season he was the Championship's highest scoring forward with 20 tries.

Dixon played  in Salford's 25-11 victory over Swinton in the 1972–73 Lancashire Cup Final during the 1972–73 season at Wilderspool Stadium, Warrington on Saturday 21 October 1972, played  in the 9-19 defeat by Wigan in the 1973–74 Lancashire Cup Final during the 1973–74 season at Wilderspool Stadium, Warrington on Saturday 13 October 1973, played  in the 2-6 defeat by Widnes in the 1974–75 Lancashire Cup Final during the 1974–75 season at Central Park, Wigan on Saturday 2 November 1974, and played  in the 7-16 defeat by Widnes in the 1975–76 Lancashire Cup Final during the 1975–76 season at Central Park, Wigan on Saturday 4 October 1975.

Dixon played , and scored a try in Salford's 7-12 defeat by Leeds in the 1972–73 Player's No.6 Trophy Final during the 1972–73 season at Fartown Ground, Huddersfield on Saturday 24 March 1973.

Dixon played  in Salford's 0-0 draw with Warrington in the 1974 BBC2 Floodlit Trophy Final during the 1974–75 season at the Willows, Salford on Tuesday 17 December 1974, and played  in the 10-5 victory over Warrington in the 1974 BBC2 Floodlit Trophy Final replay during the 1974–75 season at Wilderspool Stadium, Warrington on Tuesday 28 January 1975.

He played his last game for Salford in 1980, but played one last season in the Championship winning Hull Kingston Rovers team during the 1980–81 season. He played 418 times for Salford with 738 appearances in all first class games.

Representative honours
Dixon played in the Great Britain 1972 World Cup winning side and toured Australasia in 1974, playing in all three Tests against Australia (1 win, 2 losses) and all three in New Zealand (2 wins, 1 loss). Perhaps the highlight of his successful club career was winning the League Championship with Salford in 1973–74 and again in 1975–76. As an international he won 15 caps for Wales, and 14 for Great Britain. Only five players have played test matches for Great Britain as both a back, and a forward, they are; Colin Dixon, Frank Gallagher, Laurie Gilfedder, Billy Jarman and Harry Street.

Dixon's grandson, Chester Butler, was a member of the Wales squad for the 2017 Rugby League World Cup.

References

External links
Wakefield's spirit is intact
Good test for new Salford recruits
(archived by web.archive.org) Colin Dixon at eraofthebiff.com
(archived by web.archive.org) Colin Dixon at rlhalloffame.org.uk
'Colin Dixon with the fans after Wembley 1969' photo at flickr.com
'Wales 1975 Team - Seven of these players played for Salford at some stage' photo at flickr.com
'Chairman John Wilkinson with former greats at a dinner in 1987' photo at flickr.com
Colin Dixon's obituary
Photograph "Colin Dixon gets the ball away - Colin Dixon of Halifax gets the ball away despite the attention of Geoff Wrigglesworth in the Boxing Day game at Odsal. - Date: 26/12/1967" at rlhp.co.uk
Photograph 'Bill Ramsey forces his way over - Northern prop forward Bill Ramsey forces his way over Salford's try line after playing the ball forward. - Date: 25/04/1974' at rlhp.co.uk

1943 births
1993 deaths
Black British sportsmen
Footballers who switched code
Great Britain national rugby league team players
Halifax R.L.F.C. captains
Halifax R.L.F.C. coaches
Halifax R.L.F.C. players
Hull Kingston Rovers players
People from Butetown
Rugby league centres
Rugby league locks
Rugby league players from Cardiff
Rugby league second-rows
Rugby league utility players
Salford Red Devils coaches
Salford Red Devils players
Wales national rugby league team players
Welsh rugby league coaches
Welsh rugby league players
Welsh rugby union players